The Hepialoidea are the superfamily of "ghost moths" and "swift moths".

Fossils 
Fossil Hepialoidea appear to be few. Prohepialus (possibly Hepialidae) has been described from the about 35-million-year-old Bembridge marls of Isle of Wight. A mid-Miocene hepialoid fossil is also known from China.

References

External links
 Tree of Life
 Hepialidae of the World - List of Genera and Links to Species
Common Name Index

 
Lepidoptera superfamilies
Taxa named by James Francis Stephens